Wilmot Redd (a.k.a. Wilmot Read and Wilmot Reed) (early 17th century - September 22, 1692) was one of the victims of the Salem witch trials of 1692. She was born in Marblehead, Massachusetts, and executed by hanging on September 22, 1692. Her husband was Samuel Redd, a fisherman. She was known for her irritability, but she was given little serious attention.

Trial

Redd was apprehended on May 28, 1692, by local constable James Smith. The warrant was signed by Magistrates Jonathan Corwin and John Hathorne. The charge brought against her was one of having "committed sundry acts of witchcraft on bodys of Mary Walcott & Mercy Lewis and others in Salem Village to their great hurt."

A preliminary examination took place on May 31, 1692, at Nathan Ingersoll's house in Salem Village. This was Redd's first meeting with the children she allegedly bewitched. They promptly fell into fits, and when asked what she thought ailed them, Redd said, "I cannot tell." Urged to give an opinion, she stated, "My opinion is they are in a sad condition."

Indicted as a witch, Redd was accused of "detestable arts called Witchcraft and Sorceries wickedly, mallitiously [sic] and felloniously used, practiced & exercised at the Towne of Salem."

Death and legacy
Redd's body was buried in a common grave whose location is now unknown.  Memorial markers for her exist at Old Burial Hill in Marblehead and the Salem Witch Trials Memorial in Salem. In addition, the town has named the pond her home was adjacent to, "Redd's Pond".

References

Further reading

External links

 

1692 deaths
Year of birth unknown
17th-century executions of American people
People executed by the Massachusetts Bay Colony
Executed American women
Executed people from Massachusetts
People of the Salem witch trials
American people executed for witchcraft
People executed by the Province of Massachusetts Bay
People from Marblehead, Massachusetts
People executed by the Thirteen Colonies by hanging
People executed by Massachusetts by hanging